Alice Sinno (born September 8, 1992) is an Italian sailor. She and Elena Berta placed 19th in the women's 470 event at the 2016 Summer Olympics.

Sinno is an athlete of the Gruppo Sportivo della Marina Militare.

References

External links
 

1992 births
Living people
Italian female sailors (sport)
Olympic sailors of Italy
Sailors at the 2016 Summer Olympics – 470
Sailors of Marina Militare
21st-century Italian women